Imlie (transl. Tamarind) is an Indian Hindi-language television drama series that premiered on 16 November 2020 on StarPlus and streams on Disney+ Hotstar. Produced by Gul Khan under 4 Lions Films, it formerly starred Sumbul Touqeer Khan,Gashmeer Mahajani, Fahmaan Khan, and Mayuri Deshmukh. It was a loose adaptation of the Bengali series Ishti Kutum. Currently, it stars Megha Chakraborty, Seerat Kapoor and Karan Vohra as the second generation.

Premise 
Imlie is an 18-year-old girl, who goes through twists and journeys of life. She comes across Aditya, who eventually proves to be unworthy of her love. Soon, she forms a bond with Aryan, a businessman, and thus blossoms their eternal love, continuing beyond their untimely deaths.

18 years later
18 years later, Imlie and Aryan's daughter, (also named) Imlie and Malini and Aditya's daughter, Cheeni are raised with opposite personalities. Soon, they find their lives tangled with a young DJ and musician, Atharva, and thus begins a twisted love triangle.

Plot

Cast

Main
Sumbul Touqeer Khan as Imlie Singh Rathore (née Chaturvedi ): Executive Reporter of Bhaskar Times; Independent journalist; Meethi and Dev's daughter; Satyakam and Anu's step-daughter; Malini's half-sister; Aditya's former wife; Aryan's wife; Jr. Imlie's mother (2020–2022) (Dead)
Fahmaan Khan as Aryan Singh Rathore: Owner and CEO of Rathore Group of Companies and Bhaskar Times; Narmada's son; Arpita's brother; Imlie's husband; Jr. Imlie's father (2021–2022) (Dead)
Gashmeer Mahajani / Manasvi Vashist as Aditya Kumar Tripathi: Senior Reporter of Bhaskar Times; Aparna and Pankaj's son; Imlie and Malini's ex-husband; Cheeni's father (2020–2022)/(2022)
Mayuri Deshmukh as Malini Chaturvedi: Former professor and Dean of City College and COO of Bhaskar Times; Anuja and Dev's daughter; Imlie's half-sister; Aditya's ex-wife; Cheeni's mother (2020–2022) (Dead)
Megha Chakraborty as Jr. Imlie Rana (née Rathore): Imlie and Aryan's daughter; Cheeni and Jaggu's cousin; Atharva's wife (2022–present)
Seerat Kapoor as Cheeni Tripathi: Malini and Aditya's daughter; Jr. Imlie's cousin; Abhishek's ex-fiancée (2022–present)
Keva Shefali as Young Cheeni Tripathi (2022)
Karan Vohra as Atharva Rana: Rudra and Devika's younger son; Akash's brother; Jr. Imlie's husband (2022–present)
Zohaib Ashraf M Siddiqui as Dairya Hooda: Supervisor in Rudra Rana's company (2023-present)

Recurring
Bobby Parvez as Rudra Rana: Manish and Shivani's brother; Devika's husband; Akash and Atharva's father (2022–present)
Chaitrali Gupte as Devika Rana: Rudra's wife; Akash and Atharva's mother (2022–present)
Anuradha Singh as Divya Rana: Manish's wife; Ginny and Ripu's mother (2022–present)
Raghuveer Verma as Manish Rana: Rudra and Shivani's brother; Divya's husband; Ginny and Ripu's father (2022-present) 
Jitendra Bohara as Akash Rana: Rudra and Devika's elder son; Atharva's brother; Keya's husband (2022–present)
Hetal Yadav as Shivani Rana: Rudra and Manish's sister (2022–present)
Saumya Saraswat as Keya Akash Rana: Akash's wife (2022–present)
Nidhi Arora as Ginny Rana: Manish and Divya's daughter; Ripu's sister (2022-present) 
Satyam Joshi as Ripu Rana: Manish and Divya's son; Ginny's brother (2022-present) 
Riyansh Dabhi as Jagdeep "Jaggu" Prasad: Sundar and Arpita's son; Jr. Imlie's cousin (2022)
Chirag Mehra as Abhishek: Cheeni's ex-fiancé (2022-2023)
Kiran Khoje as Meethi: Dulari's daughter; Dev's ex-lover; Satyakam's wife; Imlie's mother; Jr. Imlie's grandmother; Cheeni's step-grandmother (2020–present)
Vijay Kumar as Satyakam: Tribal leader of Pagdandiya; Meethi's husband; Imlie's step-father; Jr. Imlie's step-grandfather (2020–2022)
Meena Naithani as Dulari Devi: Meethi's mother; Imlie's grandmother; Jr. Imlie's great-grandmother (2020–2021)
Gaurav Mukesh as Sundar Prasad: Tripathis' former househelp; Arpita's second husband; Jagdeep's father (2020–present)
Rajshri Rani as Arpita "Arpi" Rathore Prasad: Narmada's daughter; Aryan's sister; Arvind's widow; Sundar's wife; Jagdeep's mother (2021–present)
Neetu Pandey as Narmada Rathore: Aryan and Arpita's mother; Imlie and Sundar's mother-in-law; Jagdeep and Jr. Imlie's grandmother (2021–present)
Indraneel Bhattacharya as Dev Chaturvedi: Janki's son; Meethi's ex-lover; Anuja's husband; Malini and Imlie's father; Cheeni and Jr. Imlie's grandfather (2020–2021)
Jyoti Gauba as Anuja "Anu" Chaturvedi: Dev's wife, Malini's mother; Imlie's step-mother; Cheeni's grandmother; Jr. Imlie's step-grandmother (2020–present)
Piloo Vidyarthi as Janki Chaturvedi: Dev's mother; Malini and Imlie's grandmother; Cheeni and Jr. Imlie's great-grandmother (2020–2021)
Ritu Chaudhary as Aparna Tripathi: Pankaj's wife; Aditya's mother; Cheeni's grandmother (2020–2022)
Chandresh Singh as Pankaj Tripathi: Harish's brother; Aparna's husband; Aditya's father; Cheeni's grandfather (2020–2022)
Rakesh Maudgal as Harish Tripathi: Pankaj's brother; Radha's husband; Dhruv, Rupali and Nishant's father; Tanushree and Prashant's grandfather (2020–2022)
Vijaylaxmi Singh as Radha Tripathi: Harish's wife; Dhruv, Rupali and Nishant's mother; Tanushree and Prashant's grandmother (2020–2022)
Preet Kaur Nayak as Rupali "Rupi" Tripathi: Radha and Harish's daughter; Dhruv and Nishanth's sister; Pranav's ex-wife; Tanushree's mother (2020–present)
Tasheen Shah as Tanushree "Twinkle" Tripathi: Rupali and Pranav's daughter; Prashant's cousin (2020–2021)
Arham Abbasi as Nishanth Tripathi; Radha and Harish's son; Dhruv and Rupali's brother; Pallavi's husband (2020–2022)
Chandni Bhagwanani as Pallavi Tripathi (née Thakur): Nishant's wife (2021)
Faisal Sayed as Dhruv Tripathi: Radha and Harish's elder son; Nidhi's husband; Prashant's father; Tanushree's cousin (2020–2021)
Astha Agarwal as Nidhi Tripathi: Dhruv's wife; Prashant's mother (2020–2021)
Jared Saville as Prashant "Sunny" Tripathi: Nidhi and Dhruv's son (2020–2021)
Komal Kushwaha as Imlie's friend (2020)
Amit Anand Raut as Sanju: Imlie's kidnapper (2020)
Amarnath Kumar as Balmesh: Aditya's informer (2020)
Karan Thakur (actor) as Arvind Chauhan: Arpita's first husband (2021)
Vishwa Gulati as Kunal Chauhan: A lawyer who liked Malini (2021)
Naren Kumar as Prakash: Satyakam's adoptive son; Imlie's best friend (2021)
Sailesh Gulabani as Pranav: Rupali's ex-husband; Tanushree's father (2021)
Suraj Sonik as Shashank "Shanky": Malini's cousin brother (2020)
Vishal Sharma as Tripathi's family doctor (2020)
Neelima Singh as Neela: Aryan and Arpita's aunt (2022)
Resham Prashant as Preeta aka Gudiya or Baby Doll: Neela's niece; Aryan's childhood friend who wanted Aryan for his wealth (2022)
Suryansh Mishra as Madhav Tiwari who hails from Imlie's village Pagdandiya; Imlie's cameraman and friend (2022)
Veer Singh as Uday: Arpita's ex-fiancé (2022)
Vaibhavi Kapoor as Jyoti Rawat: Aryan's college friend; Harinder's ex-wife (2022)
Aamir Salim Khan as Harinder "Harry": Jyoti's ex-husband; a brotherly figure to Nargiz (2022)

Guests
Radhika Madan and Sunny Kaushal as Kartika Singh and Joginder Dhillon: To promote Shiddat (2021)
Harshad Chopda as Dr Abhimanyu Birla: To promote a generation leap in Yeh Rishta Kya Kehlata Hai (2021)
Ulka Gupta as Banni: To promote Banni Chow Home Delivery (2022)
Celesti Bairagey as Rajjo: To promote Rajjo (2022)

Production

Development and release 
Star Jalsha's Bengali series Ishti Kutum was remade in Hindi language on StarPlus as Mohi by White Horse Productions which aired from 2015 to 2016 which did not garner good viewership. However, by 4 Lions Films, producer Gul Khan remade the series again as Imlie for StarPlus stating, "I know you have heard and seen this before, many times, but we'll play it more real". The first promo of the series was released on 27 October 2020 and featured the leads.

Casting

Gashmeer Mahajani, playing the lead role of Aditya Kumar Tripathi decided to quit the show in January 2022. He said "My exit was planned two months back. The reasons for the same are best known to me and Gul Khan and I think to maintain our professional integrity, it should remain between only the two of us. It was a two-month long process in which I had to give it the time to stabilize with a new fresh track and gradually reduce my screen space so that once I exit the show, it can still run on its own merit and not get hampered. For the show to run and the new track to sustain after my exit, Aditya has to be completely wrong for Imlie if Aryan has to be completely right. These are basic scripting rules. If I was writing this script, I would have done it the same way. So in the last one and a half month when the decision of my exit was finally made, that is when they made changes in my character and I was okay with it completely. One shouldn't forget that the show-runner is Imlie and she is Sumbul Touqeer. The show runs on her shoulders".

Manasvi Vashist replaced Mahajani as Aditya but he also quit the show after few months only. Sumbul Touqeer Khan, Fahmaan Khan and Mayuri Deshmukh quit the show post generation leap in September 2022.

Megha Chakraborty was cast as female lead post generation leap and Seerat Kappor was cast as the negative lead. Karan Vohra was cast as the male lead.

On her entrance Chakraborty said, "Imlie has become a huge part of my life already, and I hope the audience will enjoy this new beginning."

Filming
The filming of the series began in October 2020. Although the series is set in New Delhi and Uttar Pradesh, it was filmed at sets in Mumbai.

On 14 April 2021, due to the sudden strict COVID regulations set in by the Chief Minister of Maharashtra, shooting of all serials were asked to halt. Imlie Team moved Ramoji Film City in Hyderabad and conducted their shoot there till the next notice.

Television special

Ravivaar With Star Parivaar (2022) 

The cast of Imlie participated in Ravivaar With Star Parivaar, a musical competition wherein eight StarPlus shows competed against each other to win the title of "Best Parivaar". Imlie emerged as the first runner-up of the show.

Adaptations
Imlie is an official adaptation of Ishti Kutum. The story of Imlie was originally based on Ishti Kutum till 250 episodes. Currently, the story is adapted from the series Milon Tithi.

Soundtrack

Awards and nominations

References

External links 
 Imlie on Disney+ Hotstar
 

Hindi-language television shows
Indian drama television series
2020 Indian television series debuts
Indian television soap operas
StarPlus original programming